The 20th European Women's Artistic Gymnastics Championships were held in Stockholm, Sweden, in May 1994.

Medalists

Senior results

All-around

Vault

Uneven bars

Balance beam

Floor exercise

References 

1994
European Artistic Gymnastics Championships
1994 in European sport
International gymnastics competitions hosted by Sweden
1994 in Swedish women's sport
May 1994 sports events in Europe
1990s in Stockholm
International sports competitions in Stockholm